Henry John Tancred (1816 – 27 April 1884), also known as Harry Tancred, was a 19th-century New Zealand politician.

Early life
Tancred was baptised on 14 May 1816 at the Isle of Wight. His father was Sir Thomas Tancred, 6th Baronet and his elder brother was Sir Thomas Tancred, 7th Baronet. He was educated at Rugby School. He served in the Austrian army and fought in Austria, Hungary and Italy. He was severely injured in a fall from a horse and had a speech impairment as a result.

New Zealand
Back in England to recuperate, he became interested in the Canterbury Association and decided to emigrate. He arrived in Canterbury in December 1850 from Wellington on the Barbara Gordon, just prior to the arrival of the first Canterbury settlers.

He married Georgeanna Janet Grace Richmond in Nelson on 30 July 1857.

Political career

Provincial Council
Tancred was one of three candidates for the role of Superintendent in 1853. The election was won by James FitzGerald.

He became a member of the Canterbury Provincial Council at its establishment in 1853 and retained membership until the abolition of provincial government in 1876. In 1866, he was elected speaker of this council.

Member of the upper house
Tancred was a member of the New Zealand Legislative Council from 1856 to 1866.

Member of the executive 
Tancred was a member of three ministries. He was appointed as a minister without portfolio in the 2nd Parliament in the Sewell Ministry, from 18 April to 20 May 1856.

In the first Stafford Ministry, which he joined on 5 August 1858 as a member of the executive council, he was appointed as Secretary for Crown Lands (19 August 1858) and three months later (3 November) Postmaster-General. He held those offices until the end of this government on 12 July 1861.

In the 3rd Parliament, he was a member of the executive council of the Domett Ministry from 6 August 1862 until 6 February 1863.

Member of the lower house

He was the Member of Parliament for Ashley in the fourth Parliament from 1867 to 1870, when he retired.

Death 
Tancred died in Christchurch on 27 April 1884, aged 68 years. He was buried at Barbadoes Street Cemetery three days later. He was survived by his wife. There were no children from the marriage.

Notes

References 

|-

1816 births
1884 deaths
Members of the New Zealand House of Representatives
Members of the Cabinet of New Zealand
Members of the New Zealand Legislative Council
Members of the Canterbury Provincial Council
Burials at Barbadoes Street Cemetery
Members of Canterbury provincial executive councils
New Zealand MPs for South Island electorates
Military personnel from the Isle of Wight
People educated at Rugby School
English emigrants to New Zealand
19th-century New Zealand politicians
Sheriffs of New Zealand